A Nod to Bob: An Artists' Tribute to Bob Dylan on His 60th Birthday is a 2001 tribute to Bob Dylan by artists on the Red House Records label.  Red House is a folk-oriented label from Dylan's home state of Minnesota.  The songs selected are almost entirely from the early phase of Dylan's career.

Track listing
All songs written by Bob Dylan. 

"All Along the Watchtower" was remixed in 2002 and released on The Paperboys' greatest hits album Tenure.

Charts

See also
List of songs written by Bob Dylan
List of artists who have covered Bob Dylan songs

References

External links 
A Nod to Bob page at Red House Records
"Happy Birthday Bob Dylan", All Things Considered, May 24, 2001

Bob Dylan tribute albums
2001 compilation albums
Folk compilation albums
Red House Records albums